Charles Darwin (1809–1882) was an English naturalist, known for his contributions to the science of evolution. 

Charles Darwin may also refer to:

People

 Charles Darwin (medical student) (1758–1778), uncle of the naturalist.
 Charles Waring Darwin (infant) (1856–1858), son of the naturalist.
 Charles Galton Darwin (1887–1962), English physicist, grandson of the naturalist.
 Charles Darwin (RAF officer) (1894–1941), First World War flying ace.
 Charles Waring Darwin (soldier) (1855–1928), British soldier and landowner.

Places
 Charles Darwin, Northern Territory, a suburb in Australia.
 Charles Darwin National Park, a protected area in Australia.
 Charles Darwin Reserve, reserve in Australia.
 Charles Darwin School, secondary school in Biggin Hill, London, England
 Charles Darwin University, a university in Australia.

Publications
 Charles Darwin: The Scholar Who Changed Human History, a 2000 illustrated book by Patrick Tort

See also

 Darwin (disambiguation)

Darwin, Charles